Lepki may refer to:
 Lepki language, of Western New Guinea
 Stare Łepki, a village in Gmina Olszanka, Poland
 Nowe Łepki, a village in Gmina Olszanka, Poland